Gandajika or Ngandajika is a town in Lomami province of the Democratic Republic of the Congo.  It is the administrative center of the territory of the same name.

Populated places in Lomami